Clanoptilus is a genus of beetles belonging to the family Melyridae.

Species
 Clanoptilus abdominalis (Fabricius, 1793) 
 Clanoptilus affinis (Ménétriés, 1832) 
 Clanoptilus ambiguus (Peyron, 1877) 
 Clanoptilus arnaizi (Pardo, 1966) 
 Clanoptilus barnevillei (Puton, 1865)
 Clanoptilus brodskyi Svihla, 1987 
 Clanoptilus calabrus (Baudi, 1873) 
 Clanoptilus durandi (Pardo, 1970) 
 Clanoptilus elegans (Olivier, 1790) 
 Clanoptilus emarginatus (Krauss, 1902) 
 Clanoptilus falcifer (Abeille de Perrin, 1882) 
 Clanoptilus geniculatus (Germar, 1824) 
 Clanoptilus imperialis (Morawitz, 1861) 
 Clanoptilus italicus (Pardo, 1967) 
 Clanoptilus karpathosensis Wittmer, 1988 
 Clanoptilus laticollis (Rosenhauer, 1856) 
 Clanoptilus maculiventris (Chevrolat, 1854) 
 Clanoptilus marginellus (Olivier, 1790) 
 Clanoptilus parilis (Erichson, 1840) 
 Clanoptilus rufus (Olivier, 1790) 
 Clanoptilus spinipennis (Germar, 1824) 
 Clanoptilus spinosus (Erichson, 1840) 
 Clanoptilus strangulatus (Abeille de Perrin, 1885)

References 

Melyridae
Cleroidea genera